Appolinariya Plekhanova (4 October 1919 – 2005) was a Soviet fencer. She competed in the women's individual foil event at the 1952 Summer Olympics.

References

External links
 

1919 births
2005 deaths
Soviet female foil fencers
Olympic fencers of the Soviet Union
Fencers at the 1952 Summer Olympics